In mathematics, Nash's theorem may refer to one of the following:
 the Nash embedding theorem in differential geometry;
 Nash's theorem on the existence of Nash equilibria in game theory.